The 2017 Central League Climax Series (CLCS) was a post-season playoff consisting of two consecutive series that determined who would represent the Central League in the Japan Series. The First Stage was a best-of-three series and the Final Stage was a best-of-six with the top seed being awarded a one-win advantage. The winner of the series advanced to the 2017 Japan Series, where they competed against the 2017 Pacific League Climax Series winner. The top three regular-season finishers played in the two series. The CLCS began with the first game of the First Stage on October 14 and ended with the final game of the Final Stage on October 24.

First stage

Summary

† This game was originally scheduled for Monday, October 16, but postponed one day due to weather.

Game 1

Game 2

Game 3

Final stage

Summary

* The Central League regular season champion is given a one-game advantage in the Final Stage.
† Game 4 was originally scheduled for Saturday, October 21, but was postponed for two days due to weather, forcing Game 5 to be subsequently postponed two days as well.

Game 1

Game 2

Game 3

Game 4

Game 5

References

Climax Series
Central League Climax Series